The Sailor Who Fell from Grace with the Sea is a novel written by Yukio Mishima, published in Japanese in 1963 and translated into English by John Nathan in 1965.

Plot
The story follows the actions of Noboru Kuroda, an adolescent boy living in Yokohama, Japan. He and his group of friends do not believe in conventional morality and are led by the "chief". Noboru discovers a peephole into his widowed mother's bedroom and uses it to spy on her. Since Noboru is interested in ships, his upper-class mother Fusako, who owns a fashion clothing store, takes him to visit one near the end of the summer. There they meet Ryuji Tsukazaki, a sailor and second mate aboard the commercial steamer Rakuyo. Ryuji has always remained distant from the land, but he has no real ties with the sea or other sailors. Ryuji and Fusako develop a romantic relationship, and their first night together is spied upon by Noboru. Noboru believes he has witnessed the true order of the universe because of Ryuji's connection to the sea.

At first Noboru reveres Ryuji, and sees him as a connection to one of the few meaningful things in the world – the sea. Noboru tells his friends about his hero. Noboru is overjoyed when Ryuji returns to the Rakuyo, leaving Fusako behind, because he sees this as being perfect. However, Ryuji eventually begins losing Noboru's respect, beginning when Ryuji meets Noboru and his gang at the park one day. Ryuji had drenched himself in the water fountain, which Noboru feels is childish. Noboru takes issue with what he perceives as an undignified appearance and greeting by Ryuji. Noboru's frustration with Ryuji culminates when Fusako reveals that she and Ryuji are engaged.

While Ryuji is sailing, he and Fusako exchange letters. Returning to Yokohama days before the New Year, he moves into their house and gets engaged to Fusako. Ryuji then lets the Rakuyo sail without him as the New Year begins. This distances him from Noboru, whose group resents fathers as a terrible manifestation of a dreadful position. Fusako has lunch with one of her clients, Yoriko, a famous actress. After Fusako breaks the news of her engagement to Ryuji, the lonely actress advises Fusako to have a private investigation done on Ryuji, sharing her disappointing experience with her ex-fiancé. Fusako ultimately decides to go forth with this idea in order to prove to Yoriko that Ryuji is the man he says he is. After they depart, the investigation is done and Ryuji passes the test. Noboru's secret of the peephole is discovered, but Ryuji does not punish him severely in order to fulfil his role of a lovable father, despite being asked to by Fusako.

As Ryuji and Fusako's wedding draws near, Noboru begins to grow more angry and calls an "emergency meeting" of the gang. Due to the philosophy of the gang they decide that the only way to make Ryuji a "hero" again is to kill and dissect him. The chief reassures the gang by quoting a Japanese law that states that juveniles are not legally punishable. Their plan is that Noboru will lure Ryuji to the dry dock in Sugita. They each bring an item to assist in the drugging and dissection of Ryuji. The items include a strong hemp rope, a thermos for the tea, cups, sugar, a blindfold, pills to drug the tea, and a scalpel. Their plan works; as he drinks the tea, Ryuji muses on the life he has given up at sea, and the life of love and death he has abandoned. The novel ends when Ryuji sees the chief putting on his gloves and, giving no attention to it, drinks his tea while lost in his thoughts.

Adaptations
The novel was adapted into the film The Sailor Who Fell from Grace with the Sea starring Kris Kristofferson and Sarah Miles in 1976 by Lewis John Carlino; the setting was changed from Japan to England. Hans Werner Henze adapted the material into his 1990 opera Das verratene Meer to a libretto by Hans-Ulrich Treichel.

References

Further reading
  Text (PDF).
 

1963 novels
Japanese-language novels
Novels by Yukio Mishima
Japanese novels adapted into films
Philosophical novels
Novels adapted into operas